Oecomys phaeotis, also known as the dusky arboreal rice rat or dusky oecomys, is a species of rodent in the genus Oecomys of family Cricetidae. It is found on the eastern slopes of the Andes of Peru, at 1500 to 2000 m altitude.

References

Literature cited
Musser, G.G. and Carleton, M.D. 2005. Superfamily Muroidea. Pp. 894–1531 in Wilson, D.E. and Reeder, D.M. (eds.). Mammal Species of the World: a taxonomic and geographic reference. 3rd ed. Baltimore: The Johns Hopkins University Press, 2 vols., 2142 pp. 
Pacheco, V. and Solari, S. 2008. . In IUCN. IUCN Red List of Threatened Species. Version 2009.2. <www.iucnredlist.org>. Downloaded on December 2, 2009.

Oecomys
Mammals of Peru
Mammals described in 1901
Taxa named by Oldfield Thomas
Taxonomy articles created by Polbot